Cypraea is a genus of medium-sized to large sea snails or cowries, marine gastropod mollusks in the family Cypraeidae, the cowries.

Species
Species within the genus Cypraea include:
 † Cypraea ficoides (Hutton, 1873) 
 Cypraea pantherina Lightfoot, 1786
 † Cypraea porcellus Brocchi, 1814
 Cypraea tigris Linnaeus, 1758

Nomen dubium
 Cypraea contrastriata Perry, 1811 (synonyms: Arestorides argus contrastriata (Perry, 1811); Cypraea argus contrastriata Perry, 1811; Talparia argus contrastriata (Perry, 1811) )

Synonyms
Almost all species previously belonging to Cypraea have been reassigned to other genera within the family Cypraeidae:

 Cypraea achatidea Sowerby, 1837: synonym of Schilderia achatidea
 Cypraea acicularis Gmelin, 1791: synonym of Erosaria acicularis
 Cypraea aenigma Lorenz, 2002: synonym of Nesiocypraea aenigma
 Cypraea albuginosa Gray, 1825: synonym of Erosaria albuginosa
 Cypraea alexhuberti Lorenz & Huber, 1999: synonym of Austrasiatica alexhuberti
 Cypraea alfredensis (Schilder & Schilder, 1929): synonym of Cypraeovula alfredensis (Schilder & Schilder, 1929)
 Cypraea algoensis Gray, 1825: synonym of Cypraeovula algoensis
 Cypraea alisonae Burgess, 1983: synonym of Blasicrura alisonae
 Cypraea amarata (Meuschen, 1787): synonym of Mauritia scurra
 Cypraea amphitales Melvill, 1888 : synonym of Cypraeovula amphitales
 Cypraea androyensis Blocher & Lorenz, 1999: synonym of Palmadusta androyensis
 Cypraea angelicae Clover, 1974: synonym of Zonaria angelicae
 Cypraea angioyorum Biraghi, 1978: synonym of Erronea angioyorum
 Cypraea angustata Gmelin, 1791: synonym of Notocypraea angustata
 Cypraea annettae Dall, 1909: synonym of Pseudozonaria annettae
 Cypraea annulus Linnaeus, 1758: synonym of Monetaria annulus
 Cypraea arabica Linnaeus, 1758: synonym of Mauritia arabica
 Cypraea arabicula: synonym of Pseudozonaria arabicula
 Cypraea argus Linnaeus, 1758: synonym of Arestorides argus
 Cypraea armeniaca Verco, 1912: synonym of Umbilia armeniaca
 Cypraea artuffeli Jousseaume, 1876: synonym of Palmadusta artuffeli
 Cypraea aurantium Gmelin, 1791: synonym of Lyncina aurantium
 Cypraea barbieri Raybaudi, 1986: synonym of Purpuradusta barbieri
 Cypraea asellus Linnaeus, 1758: synonym of Palmadusta asellus
 Cypraea barclayi Reeve, 1857: synonym of Contradusta barclayi
 Cypraea beckii Gaskoin, 1836 is a synonym of Erosaria beckii
 Cypraea bernardi Richard, 1974: synonym of Erosaria bernardi
 Cypraea bistrinotata Schilder & Schilder, 1937: synonym of Pustularia bistrinotata
 Cypraea boivinii Kiener, 1843: synonym of Erosaria boivinii
 Cypraea boucheti Lorenz, 2002: synonym of Palmulacypraea boucheti
 Cypraea bregeriana Crosse, 1868: synonym of Contradusta bregeriana
 Cypraea brevidentata Sowerby, 1870: synonym of Bistolida brevidentata
 Cypraea broderipii Gray in Sowerby, 1832: synonym of Lyncina broderipii
 Cypraea camelopardalis Perry, 1811: synonym of Lyncina camelopardalis
 Cypraea capensis: synonym of Cypraeovula capensis
 Cypraea capricornica Lorenz, 1989is a synonym of Umbilia capricornica
 Cypraea caputdraconis Melvill, 1888: synonym of Monetaria caputdraconis
 Cypraea caputserpentis Linnaeus, 1758: synonym of Erosaria caputserpentis
 Cypraea carneola Linnaeus, 1758: synonym of Lyncina carneola
 Cypraea carneola sowerbyi Anton, 1838: synonym of Lyncina carneola (Linnaeus, 1758)
 Cypraea castanea Higgins, 1868: synonym of Cypraeovula castanea
 Cypraea catholicorum Schilder, 1938: synonym of Cribrarula catholicorum
 Cypraea caurica Linnaeus, 1758: synonym of Erronea caurica
 Cypraea cernica Sowerby, 1870: synonym of Erosaria cernica
 Cypraea cervinetta Kiener, 1843: synonym of Macrocypraea cervinetta
 Cypraea cervus Linnaeus, 1771: synonym of Macrocypraea cervus
 Cypraea chiapponii Lorenz, 1999: synonym of Pustularia chiapponii
 Cypraea childreni Gray, 1825: synonym of Ipsa childreni
 Cypraea chinensis Gmelin, 1791: synonym of Ovatipsa chinensis
 Cypraea cicercula Linnaeus, 1758: synonym of Pustularia cicercula
 Cypraea cinerea Gmelin, 1791: synonym of Luria cinerea
 Cypraea citrina Gray, 1825: synonym of Erosaria citrina
 Cypraea clandestina Linnaeus, 1767: synonym of Palmadusta clandestina
 Cypraea cohenae Burgess, 1965: synonym of Cypraeovula cohenae
 Cypraea colligata Lorenz, 2002: synonym of Cypraeovula colligata
 Cypraea coloba Melvill, 1888: synonym of Ovatipsa coloba
 Cypraea comptonii Gray, 1847: synonym of Notocypraea comptoni
 Cypraea connelli Liltved, 1983: synonym of Cypraeovula connelli
 Cypraea conoidea Scopoli, 1786: synonym of Morum oniscus (Linnaeus, 1767)
 Cypraea contaminata Sowerby, 1832: synonym of Palmadusta contaminata
 Cypraea controversa Gray, 1824: synonym of Luria controversa
 Cypraea coronata Schilder 1930: synonym of Cypraeovula coronata
 Cypraea costispunctata G. B. Sowerby II, 1870: synonym of Pusula costispunctata (G. B. Sowerby II, 1870)
 Cypraea coxeni Cox, 1873: synonym of Eclogavena coxeni
 Cypraea cribellum Gaskoin, 1849: synonym of Cribrarula cribellum
 Cypraea cribraria Linnaeus, 1758: synonym of Cribrarula cribraria
 Cypraea cruenta: synonym of Ovatipsa chinensis
 Cypraea cruickshanki Kilburn, 1972: synonym of Cypraeovula cruickshanki
 Cypraea cumingii Sowerby, 1832: synonym of Cribrarula cumingii
 Cypraea cylindrica Born, 1778: synonym of Erronea cylindrica
 Cypraea dayritiana Cate, 1963: synonym of Eclogavena dayritiana
 Cypraea decipiens Smith, 1880: synonym of Zoila decipiens
 Cypraea declivis Sowerby II, 1870: synonym of Notocypraea declivis
 Cypraea deforges] Lorenz, 2002: synonym of Austrasiatica deforgesi
 Cypraea depressa Gray, 1824: synonym of Mauritia depressa
 Cypraea diauges Melvill 1888 syn. of Bistolida diauges
 Cypraea dillwyni Schilder 1922: synonym of Cryptocypraea dillwyni
 Cypraea diluculum Reeve, 1845: synonym of Palmadusta diluculum
 Cypraea eburnea Barnes, 1824: synonym of Erosaria eburnea
 Cypraea edentula: synonym of Cypraeovula edentula
 Cypraea eglantina Duclos, 1833: synonym of Mauritia eglantina
 Cypraea eludens Raybaudi, 1991: synonym of Zoila eludens
 Cypraea englerti Summers & Burgess, 1965: synonym of Erosaria englerti
 Cypraea erosa Linnaeus, 1758: synonym of Erosaria erosa
 Cypraea errones Linnaeus, 1758: synonym of Erronea errones
 Cypraea erythraeensis Sowerby, 1837: synonym of Bistolida erythraeensis
 Cypraea esontropia Duclos, 1833: synonym of Cribrarula esontropia
 Cypraea exmouthensis Melvill, 1888: synonym of Cribrarula exmouthensis
 Cypraea exusta Sowerby, 1832: synonym of Talparia exusta
 Cypraea fallax Smith, 1881: synonym of Cribrarula fallax
 Cypraea felina Gmelin, 1791: synonym of Melicerona felina
 Cypraea fernandoi Cate, 1969: synonym of Erosa fernadoi
 Cypraea fimbriata Gmelin, 1791: synonym of Purpuradusta fimbriata
 Cypraea friendii Gray, 1831: synonym of Zoila friendii
 Cypraea fultoni Sowerby, 1903: synonym of Barycypraea fultoni
 Cypraea fuscodentata: synonym of Cypraeovula fuscodentata
 Cypraea fuscorubra Shaw, 1909: synonym of Cypraeovula fuscorubra
 Cypraea gangranosa Dillwyn, 1817: synonym of Erosaria gangranosa
 Cypraea garciai Lorenz & Raines, 2001: synonym of Cribrarula garciai
 Cypraea gaskoini Reeve, 1846: synonym of Cribrarula gaskoini
 Cypraea gilvella Lorenz, 2002: synonym of Luria gilvella
 Cypraea globosa: synonym of Lyncina lynx
 Cypraea globulus Linnaeus, 1758: synonym of Pustularia globulus
 Cypraea goodalli Sowerby I, 1832: synonym of Bistolida goodallii
 Cypraea gracilis Gaskoin, 1849: synonym of Purpuradusta gracilis
 Cypraea granulata Pease, 1862: synonym of Nucleolaria granulata
 Cypraea grayana Schilder, 1930: synonym of Mauritia grayana
 Cypraea guttata Gmelin, 1791: synonym of Perisserosa guttata
 Cypraea hammondae Iredale, 1939: synonym of Purpuradusta hammondae
 Cypraea hartsmithi Schilder, 1967: synonym of Notocypraea hartsmithi
 Cypraea helvola Linnaeus, 1758: synonym of Erosaria helvola
 Cypraea hesitata Jousseaume, 1884: synonym of Umbilia hesitata
 Cypraea hirundo Linnaeus, 1758: synonym of Blasicrura hirundo
 Cypraea histrio Gmelin, 1791: synonym of Mauritia histrio
 Cypraea humphreysii Gray, 1825: synonym of Palmadusta humphreysii
 Cypraea hungerfordi lovetha Poppe, Tagaro & Buijse, 2005: synonym of Paradusta hungerfordi bealsi (Mock, 1996)
 Cypraea inocellata Gray is a synonym of Erosaria miliaris
 Cypraea interrupta Gray, 1824: synonym of Blasicrura interrupta
 Cypraea isabella Linnaeus, 1758: synonym of Luria isabella
 Cypraea kieneri Hidalgo, 1906: synonym of Bistolida kieneri
 Cypraea lamarckii Gray, 1825: synonym of Erosaria lamarckii
 Cypraea lentiginosa: synonym of Palmadusta lentiginosa
 Cypraea leucodon Broderip, 1828: synonym of Lyncina leucodon  (Broderip, 1828)
 Cypraea leucodon leucodon Broderip, 1828: synonym of Lyncina leucodon  (Broderip, 1828)
 Cypraea leviathan Schilder & Schilder, 1937: synonym of Lyncina leviathan
 Cypraea lisetae Kilburn, 1975: synonym of Nesiocypraea lisetae
 Cypraea limacina Lamarck, 1810: synonym of Staphylaea limacina
 Cypraea lurica: synonym of Erronea caurica
 Cypraea lurida Linnaeus: synonym of Luria lurida
 Cypraea lynx Linnaeus, 1758: synonym of Lyncina lynx
 Cypraea macandrewi Sowerby, 1870: synonym of Erosaria macandrewi
 Cypraea maculifera Schilder, 1932: synonym of Mauritia maculifera
 Cypraea madagascariensis Gmelin, 1790: synonym of Staphylaea nucleus madagascariensis
 Cypraea mappa Linnaeus, 1758: synonym of Leporicypraea mappa
 Cypraea margarita Dillwyn, 1817: synonym of Pustularia margarita
 Cypraea marginalis Dillwyn, 1827: synonym of Erosaria marginalis
 Cypraea mariae Schilder, 1927: synonym of Annepona mariae
 Cypraea mauiensis Burgess, 1967: synonym of Pustularia mauiensis
 Cypraea mauritiana Linnaeus, 1758: synonym of Mauritia mauritiana
 Cypraea microdon Gray, 1828: synonym of Purpuradusta microdon
 Cypraea miliaris Gmelin, 1790: synonym of Erosaria miliaris
 Cypraea minoridens Melvill, 1901: synonym of Purpuradusta minoridens
 Cypraea moneta Linnaeus, 1758: synonym of Monetaria moneta
 Cypraea mus Linnaeus, 1758: synonym of Muracypraea mus
 Cypraea nebrites Melvill, 1888: synonym of Erosaria nebrites
 Cypraea nigropunctata Gray, 1828: synonym of Pseudozonaria nigropunctata
 Cypraea nivosa Broderip, 1827: synonym of Lyncina nivosa
 Cypraea nucleus Linnaeus, 1758: synonym of Staphylaea nucleus
 Cypraea ocellata L.: synonym of Erosaria ocellata
 Cypraea oniscus Lamarck, 1810: synonym of Triviella aperta (Swainson, 1822)
 Cypraea onyx Linnaeus, 1758: synonym of Erronea onyx
 Cypraea owenii Sowerby, 1837: synonym of Bistolida owenii
 Cypraea ovum Gmelin 1791   (synonym of Erronea ovum
 Cypraea pallida: synonym of Erronea pallida
 Cypraea pallidula (Gaskoin, 1849): synonym of Blasicrura pallidula 
 Cypraea pediculus var. cimex G. B. Sowerby II, 1870: synonym of Pusula cimex (G. B. Sowerby II, 1870)
 Cypraea picta Gray, 1824: synonym of Zonaria picta
 Cypraea piperita Gray, 1825: synonym of Notocypraea piperita
 Cypraea poraria Linnaeus, 1758: synonym of Erosaria poraria
 Cypraea propinqua Garrett, 1879: synonym of Lyncina carneola
 Cypraea pulchra Gray, 1824: synonym of Luria pulchra
 Cypraea pulchella Swainson, 1823: synonym of Contradusta pulchella
 Cypraea punctata Linnaeus, 1771: synonym of Ransoniella punctata
 Cypraea pyriformis Gray, 1824 (synonym of Erronea pyriformis
 Cypraea pyrum Gmelin, 1791 (synonym of Zonaria pyrum
 Cypraea reticulata Martyn, 1784: synonym of Mauritia histrio
 Cypraea robertsi Hidalgo, 1906: synonym of Pseudozonaria robertsi
 Cypraea sakuraii (Habe, 1970): synonym of Austrasiatica sakuraii (Habe, 1970)
 Cypraea schilderorum Iredale, 1939: synonym of Lyncina schilderorum
 Cypraea scurra Gmelin, 1791: synonym of Mauritia scurra
 Cypraea solandri G. B. Sowerby I, 1832: synonym of Pusula solandri (G. B. Sowerby I, 1832)
 Cypraea spadicea Swainson, 1823: synonym of Neobernaya spadicea
 Cypraea spurca Linnaeus, 1758: synonym of Erosaria spurca
 Cypraea staphylaea Linnaeus, 1758: synonym of Staphylaea staphylaea
 Cypraea stercoraria Linnaeus: synonym of Trona stercoraria
 Cypraea stolida Linnaeus, 1758: synonym of Bistolida stolida
 Cypraea subviridis Reeve, 1835: synonym of Erronea subviridis (Reeve, 1835)
 Cypraea sulcidentata  Gray, 1824): synonym of Lyncina sulcidentata
 Cypraea surinamensis G. Perry, 1811: synonym of Propustularia surinamensis
 Cypraea talpa Linnaeus, 1758: synonym of Talparia talpa
 Cypraea teres Gmelin, 1791: synonym of Blasicrura teres
 Cypraea tessellata Swainson, 1822: synonym of Luria tessellata
 Cypraea testudinaria Linnaeus, 1758: synonym of Chelycypraea testudinaria
 Cypraea teuleri Cazenavette, 1845: synonym of Bernaya teulerei
 Cypraea thomasi Crosse, 1865: synonym of Erosaria thomasi
 Cypraea turdus Lamarck, 1810: synonym of Erosaria turdus
 Cypraea umbilicata G.B. Sowerby I, 1825: synonym of Umbilia hesitata (Iredale, 1916)
 Cypraea ursellus Gmelin, 1791: synonym of Bistolida ursellus
 Cypraea ventriculus Lamarck, 1810: synonym of Lyncina ventriculus
 Cypraea venusta Sowerby, 1847: synonym of Zoila venusta
 Cypraea verhoefi Burgess, 1982: synonym of Cypraeovula castanea (Higgins, 1868)
 Cypraea vitellus Linnaeus, 1758: synonym of Lyncina vitellus
 Cypraea vredenburgi Schilder, 1927: synonym of Erronea vredenburgi
 Cypraea walkeri Sowerby, 1832: synonym of Contradusta walkeri
 Cypraea xanthodon Sowerby I, 1832: synonym of Erronea xanthodon
 Cypraea zebra Linnaeus, 1758: synonym of Macrocypraea zebra
 Cypraea ziczac Linnaeus, 1758: synonym of Palmadusta ziczac
 Cypraea zonaria Gmelin: synonym of Zonaria zonaria

References

External links 
  Linnaeus, C. (1758). Systema Naturae per regna tria naturae, secundum classes, ordines, genera, species, cum characteribus, differentiis, synonymis, locis. Editio decima, reformata. Laurentius Salvius: Holmiae. ii, 824 pp 

Cypraeidae
Gastropod genera
Extant Miocene first appearances